National Diploma in Technology (NDT) is a three-year full-time engineering program for engineers. At present it is conducted by the Institute of Technology, University of Moratuwa.

History
The National Diploma in Technology (NDT) program is intended to generate Incorporated Engineers . It was established in 1893 at Ceylon Technical Faculty, Maradana, called a Junior Technical Officers (JTO) course. In 1960 this program transferred to the Institute of Practical Technology (IPT) at Katubedda (presently the University of Moratuwa) and to the Hardy Senior Technological Institute at Ampara. The Course was held inside the katubedda premises of University of moratuwa until it is moved to new premises of the Institute of Technology to Diyagama premises of University of Moratuwa.

Fields of Courses
Marine Engineering Technology
Nautical Studies &Technology
Chemical Engineering Technology
Civil Engineering Technology
Electrical Engineering Technology
Electronic & Telecommunication Engineering Technology
Mechanical Engineering Technology
Polymer Technology
Textile & Clothing Technology
Information Technology

Selection procedure
Selection for the NDT program is especially based on the performance (z score) that student done at G.C.E Advanced Level exam and Institute's general knowledge exam.

References

Educational qualifications in Sri Lanka
Professional titles and certifications
Vocational education in Sri Lanka
University of Moratuwa